Franklin Standard Johnson (June 8, 1949 – October 2021) was a Cuban basketball player who won the bronze medal with the men's national team at the 1972 Summer Olympics in Munich, West Germany. He was born in Havana in June 1949.

Standard died in October 2021, at the age of 72.

References

Sources
databaseOlympics

1949 births
2021 deaths
Basketball players from Havana
Cuban men's basketball players
1970 FIBA World Championship players
Basketball players at the 1968 Summer Olympics
Basketball players at the 1972 Summer Olympics
Olympic bronze medalists for Cuba
Olympic medalists in basketball
Basketball players at the 1971 Pan American Games
Pan American Games bronze medalists for Cuba
Medalists at the 1972 Summer Olympics
Olympic basketball players of Cuba
Pan American Games medalists in basketball
Medalists at the 1971 Pan American Games